Léandre Griffit (born 21 May 1984) is a French professional footballer who plays as a winger and is currently a free agent.

Career

Europe
Griffit was born in Maubeuge. He began his career in his native France with Amiens SC, before moving to Southampton in the Premiership in 2003. He only played seven games for Southampton and scored against Blackburn Rovers and Newcastle United. He was loaned out to Leeds United and Rotherham United before being released.

He then moved to Sweden and played for IF Elfsborg where he only played 21 games and was loaned out to IFK Norrköping in the 2007–08 season. In the summer of 2008 he went on an unsuccessful trial with Championship Plymouth Argyle. He then went on trial with Neil Warnock's Crystal Palace and was signed, but only made a handful of appearances for the club before departing.

North America
After an unsuccessful trial with Major League Soccer club Houston Dynamo, Griffit went on to sign with Houston's league rivals Columbus Crew on 16 April 2010.

Griffit made his first-team debut for the Crew on 6 July 2010 in the Black & Gold's 3–0 home triumph over the USL-2 Charleston Battery in the 2010 Lamar Hunt US Open Cup Quarterfinals. He entered the match in the 76th minute and was credited with an assist on the Crew's third goal.

He made his first MLS appearance on 24 July 2010 against the Dynamo, entering in the 87th minute, and scoring his first MLS goal three minutes later by collecting a rebound of a shot by Guillermo Barros Schelotto.

On 15 July 2011, he was traded to Toronto FC along with Andy Iro for Tony Tchani. Griffit made his debut for Toronto in the CONCACAF Champions League group stage on 25 August against FC Dallas, he came on as a second half sub for Gianluca Zavarise.

Griffit was waived by Toronto on 23 November 2011.

Personal 
Griffit is married to Milena and they have a son, Enzo.

Career statistics

Honours
IF Elfsborg
 2006 Allsvenskan champions

References

External links
 
 
 

1984 births
Living people
People from Maubeuge
French people of Martiniquais descent
French footballers
France under-21 international footballers
Amiens SC players
Southampton F.C. players
Leeds United F.C. players
Rotherham United F.C. players
IF Elfsborg players
IFK Norrköping players
Crystal Palace F.C. players
Columbus Crew players
Toronto FC players
Premier League players
English Football League players
Allsvenskan players
Major League Soccer players
Expatriate footballers in England
Expatriate footballers in Sweden
Expatriate soccer players in the United States
UR La Louvière Centre players
French expatriate footballers
French expatriate sportspeople in the United States
Association football wingers
Sportspeople from Nord (French department)
Footballers from Hauts-de-France
French expatriate sportspeople in England
French expatriate sportspeople in Sweden
French expatriate sportspeople in Canada
Expatriate soccer players in Canada
Expatriate footballers in Belgium
French expatriate sportspeople in Belgium